Lina Júlia Francisco Magaia (1945 – June 27, 2011) was a Mozambican writer, journalist and veteran of the war for the independence of Mozambique. She was a woman of many facets, which stood out during the life in areas such as writing, film, rural development, or even as a soldier of the liberation of the country from colonial rule.

Biography

Lina Magaia was born in Maputo in 1945. While still at school she joined the Mozambican Liberation Front and was imprisoned for three months for political activities. She was one of the first Mozambican women to receive a scholarship to study abroad, earning a BSc degree from the University of Lisbon; she subsequently went to Tanzania for military training and in 1975 became a member of the FRELIMO liberation army.

In 1980, she was involved with the "Green Zones" project of the Organization of Mozambican Women that was aimed at supplying food to the urban areas, and two years later she went to Manhiça in Maputo Province, where she became deputy director for the Maragra state sugar farm. In 1986, she became director of agricultural development for Manhiça District, but her work was to come under attack by the militant resistant movement RENAMO during the post-Independence internal conflicts.

She died on June 27, 2011, few months after phone meeting with the Chairwoman of the Republicans of Mozambique, victim of cardiac Asthma. She was described by Mozambican Prime Minister as "a great fighter and highly active citizen who, in the various stages of her life, gave the best of herself to the Mozambican nation".

Writing

Her books Dumba Nengue (1987; published in English as Run For Your Life) and Duplo massacre en Moçambique (1989; Double Massacre in Mozambique) draw on eyewitness accounts from survivors of atrocities in the Mozambican Civil War, and contain gruesome episodes illustrating the savage nature of the war and of the apartheid regime's surrogate force, the RENAMO rebels. A third book, Delehta (1994), set during the war, is part fiction, part documentary. Magaia's final work was Recordacoes da Vovo Marta ("Memories of Grandma Marta"), published in 2011, and based on lengthy interviews with one of Mozambique's oldest women, 99-year-old Marta Mbocota Guebuza, mother of former Mozambican President Armando Guebuza.
Lina was my friend and a friend to President Armando Emilio Guebusa who she always refer to as "Armando"

Published works
Dumba Nengue: Historias Trágicas do Banditismo (1987). 
Run for Your Life: Peasant tales of tragedy in Mozambique; English-language translation by Michael Wolfers, historical introduction by Allen Isaacman (Africa World Press, 1988).  (pbk); 
Duplo massacre en Moçambique: Histórias trágicas do banditismo – II (1989)
Doppio massacro: storie tragiche del banditismo in Mozambico (1990). 
Delehta: Pulos na vida (1994)
Memories of Grandma Marta (2011)

References

Further reading
 Nancy Murray, "Mozambique: the revolution and the bandits: an interview with Lina Magaia", Race & Class, April 1989, vol. 30, no. 4, pp. 21–29.

1940 births
2011 deaths
Mozambican women writers
Portuguese-language writers
Women biographers
Women novelists
20th-century novelists
20th-century women writers
20th-century biographers
People from Maputo